Michael J. Glennon is professor of international law at The Fletcher School of Law and Diplomacy at Tufts University.  He is the author of National Security and Double Government (2014).

Glennon studied political science at the College of St. Thomas (B.A., 1970).  As an undergraduate, he worked for three summers as a staff assistant for congressman Donald M. Fraser (D-MN). Glennon then attended the University of Minnesota Law School (J.D., 1973).  After graduating law school, Glennon worked as assistant counsel for the Office of the Legislative Counsel at the United States Senate.

From 1977-1980, he was counsel to the Senate Foreign Relations Committee. Glennon was professor of law at the University of California, Davis from 1987-2002, and a fellow at the Woodrow Wilson International Center for Scholars from 2001-2002.  Since 2002, he has been professor of international law at the Fletcher School of Law and Diplomacy at Tufts University.

Selected works
Books
National Security and Double Government (2014)
The Fog of Law: Pragmatism, Security, and International Law (2010)
Limits of Law, Prerogatives of Power: Interventionism after Kosovo (2001)

References

University of Minnesota Law School alumni
American legal scholars
The Fletcher School at Tufts University faculty
University of St. Thomas (Minnesota) alumni
Massachusetts lawyers